Dasypoda is a genus of bees in the family Melittidae.

Species
 Dasypoda albimana Pérez, 1905
 Dasypoda albipila Spinola, 1838
 Dasypoda altercator (Harris 1780)
 Dasypoda argentata Panzer 1809
 Dasypoda aurata Rudow, 1881
 Dasypoda braccata Eversmann 1852
 Dasypoda brevicornis Pérez, 1895
 Dasypoda chinensis Wu, 1978
 Dasypoda cingulata Erichson 1835
 Dasypoda cockerelli Yasumatsu, 1935
 Dasypoda comberi Cockerell 1911
 Dasypoda crassicornis Friese, 1896
 Dasypoda dusmeti Quilis 1928
 Dasypoda frieseana Schletterer, 1890
 Dasypoda gusenleitneri Michez 2004
 Dasypoda heliocharis Gistel 1857
 Dasypoda hirtipes Fabricius, 1793
 Dasypoda iberica Warncke, 1973
 Dasypoda japonica Cockerell, 1911
 Dasypoda leucoura Rudow, 1882
 Dasypoda litigator Baker, 2002
 Dasypoda longigena Schletterer, 1890
 Dasypoda maura Pérez, 1895
 Dasypoda michezi Radchenko, 2017
 Dasypoda morawitzi Radchenko, 2016
 Dasypoda morotei Quilis, 1928
 Dasypoda oraniensis Pérez, 1895
 Dasypoda patinyi Michez, 2002
 Dasypoda pyriformis Radoszkowski, 1887
 Dasypoda pyrotrichia Förster, 1855
 Dasypoda rudis Gistel 1857
 Dasypoda sichuanensis Wu, 2000
 Dasypoda sinuata Pérez, 1895
 Dasypoda spinigera Kohl 1905
 Dasypoda syriensis Michez 2004
 Dasypoda tibialis Morawitz, 1880
 Dasypoda toroki Michez 2004
 Dasypoda tubera Warncke 1973
 Dasypoda visnaga (Rossi, 1790)
 Dasypoda vulpecula Lebedev, 1929
 Dasypoda warnckei Michez 2004

See also

References

Bee genera
Melittidae